Dave Bennett (born November 25, 1963) is an American software engineer. Most recently, he was the CTO of Axway, as well as a board member of Axway NA.

Education
Bennett graduated from DeVry Institute in 1985 with a BS in Computer Science.

Career
Bennett started his career in Okinawa, Japan, as a software engineer at Bank of America, where he integrated several core banking systems using specialized communications protocols. In 1987, he was named Assistant Vice President, Regional Banks & Item Processing.

In 1989, Bennett joined Gateway Data Sciences, Inc., a startup in Tempe, Arizona, as the System Engineering Services Director. In 1992, he became the company's Engineering/Technical Executive and developed the first IP-based wireless receiving solution for supply chain execution and store receiving. After the company's IPO in 1996, Bennett founded B2B technology company Cyclone Commerce, Inc., where he served as the CTO and pioneered business-to-business collaborations and partner management, and authored or co-authored several standards and patents for B2B technologies.

In 2006, Axway acquired Cyclone Commerce, Inc. Bennett was named CTO and joined the board of Axway NA. In 2009, he joined the MIT Enterprise Forum Phoenix Board to support business development in Arizona. In 2011, Bennett assisted Axway in their initial public offering.

Bennett joined Orionhealth in 2013.

Notes

References
"UK employees continue to send physical documents despite knowing data loss risks." 17 December 2008. IT Backbones.
King, Leo. "Businesses 'fail to learn' from HMRC data loss disaster." 15 December 2008. Computerworld.
Schooff, Peter. "Axway Acquires Tumbleweed: A Live Podcast With Dave Bennett." 10 June 2008. ebizQ.
Winograd, Jeanne. "Cyclone founders whip up security for Internet users." 19 November 2004. Phoenix Business Journal.
Songini, Marc L. "Cyclone Commerce Helps McKesson Hook Up With Suppliers." 23 September 2002. Computerworld.
"W3C Message Delivery." 13 April 2004. W3C.

1965 births
American chief technology officers
21st-century American engineers
Living people